Zagorica pri Rovah ( or) is a small village east of Radomlje in the Municipality of Domžale in the Upper Carniola region of Slovenia.

Name
The name of the settlement was changed from Zagorica to Zagorica pri Rovah in 1955. In the past the German name was Sagoritz.

References

External links

Zagorica pri Rovah on Geopedia

Populated places in the Municipality of Domžale